Sichel is a surname of German origin. Individuals with the name "Sichel" include:

 Alice Model, philanthropist born Alice Sichel
 Edith Helen Sichel, author
 Ernest Leopold Sichel, artist
 Frédéric Jules Sichel, established the first ophthalmic clinic in Paris; entomologist
 Herbert Sichel, statistician, developed the Sichel-t estimator and the Sichel distribution
 Jennifer Sichel, coxswain
 John Sichel, director
 Michael Sichel, fencer
 Peter Sichel, the CIA’s Distinguished Intelligence Medal recipient, created success of the once largest wine brand in the world 
 Philip Sichel, early settler of Los Angeles and namesake of Los Angeles' Sichel Street
 Sebastián Sichel, Chilean politician and lawyer, born Sebastián Iglesias
 Walter Sichel, biographer and lawyer
 William Sichel, ultra marathon runner, has set 716 ultra running records as of 9/4/19

See also
Pelecus cultratus, a fish with multiple common names including "sichel"
Seychelles